Hupfeld is a surname. Notable people with the surname include:

Hans-Hermann Hupfeld, German physicist
Herman Hupfeld, American songwriter
Hermann Hupfeld, German Orientalist and Biblical commentator
Ludwig Hupfeld, German piano maker (and his company Ludwig Hupfeld, AG, Leipzig)